In geometry, the truncated order-7 heptagonal tiling is a uniform tiling of the hyperbolic plane. It has Schläfli symbol of t0,1{7,7}, constructed from one heptagons and two tetrakaidecagons around every vertex.

Related tilings

See also
Square tiling
Uniform tilings in hyperbolic plane
List of regular polytopes

References
 John H. Conway, Heidi Burgiel, Chaim Goodman-Strass, The Symmetries of Things 2008,  (Chapter 19, The Hyperbolic Archimedean Tessellations)

External links 

 Hyperbolic and Spherical Tiling Gallery
 KaleidoTile 3: Educational software to create spherical, planar and hyperbolic tilings
 Hyperbolic Planar Tessellations, Don Hatch

Heptagonal tilings
Hyperbolic tilings
Isogonal tilings
Isohedral tilings
Order-7 tilings
Truncated tilings